Johannes Pedersen Deichmann (1790 – 14 April 1832) was a Norwegian politician.

He was elected to the Norwegian Parliament in 1830, representing the constituency of Drammen. He worked as a shoemaker and farm owner in that city. He sat through only one term.

References

1790 births
1832 deaths
Members of the Storting
Buskerud politicians
Politicians from Drammen